Wang Yuqing (born 6 May 1994) is a Chinese ice hockey goaltender and member of the Chinese national ice hockey team,  playing in the Zhenskaya Hockey League (ZhHL) with the Shenzhen KRS.

Wang represented China in the women's ice hockey tournament at the 2022 Winter Olympics in Beijing.

Career statistics

International

Sources:

References

External links
 
 

1994 births
Living people
Asian Games medalists in ice hockey
Asian Games silver medalists for China
Chinese women's ice hockey goaltenders
Competitors at the 2015 Winter Universiade
Competitors at the 2017 Winter Universiade
Ice hockey players at the 2017 Asian Winter Games
Ice hockey players at the 2022 Winter Olympics
Medalists at the 2017 Asian Winter Games
Olympic ice hockey players of China
Shenzhen KRS Vanke Rays players
Sportspeople from Harbin